Lisa Raymond and Rennae Stubbs were the defending champions, but competed this year with different partners. Both players faced each other at the first round, in which Stubbs (teaming up with Cara Black) defeated Raymond (teaming up with Mary Pierce) in three sets.

Stubbs and Black will eventually win the title, by defeating Anna-Lena Grönefeld and Julia Schruff 6–3, 6–2 in the final.

Seeds

Draw

Draw

References
 Official results archive (ITF)
 Official results archive (WTA)

Doubles
Porsche Tennis Grand Prix